Veleropilina reticulata is a species of monoplacophoran, a superficially limpet-like marine mollusc. It is found off the coast of Italy in the Mediterranean Sea.

References

Monoplacophora